is a Japanese manga series written and illustrated by Kazuhiro Fujita. It was serialized in Shogakukan's shōnen manga magazine Weekly Shōnen Sunday from January 1990 to October 1996, with its chapters collected in 33 tankōbon volumes. The series follows the adventures of a boy named Ushio Aotsuki, the son of a temple keeper, who after having reluctantly released the imprisoned powerful tiger-like monster, Tora, the two begin a journey together, fighting against supernatural beings threatening the world.

An 11-episode (including an additional episode) original video animation (OVA) adaptation, produced by Toho and animated by Pastel, was released from September 1992 to October 1993. The series was later adapted into a 39-episode anime television series by MAPPA and Studio VOLN, which aired from July 2015 to June 2016. In North America, the OVA was licensed by ADV Films in 1998, and re-released in 2003, while the anime television series was licensed by Sentai Filmworks in 2015.

Ushio & Tora won the 37th Shogakukan Manga Award in the shōnen category in 1992 and the Seiun Award in the Best Comic category in 1997. By 2015, the manga had over 30 million copies in circulation. The series has been overall well received by critics, highlighting the relationship between the two main characters and praising its comedy and action sequences. The series, however, has been criticized for the simplicity of the story and (specifically the OVA adaptation) for the "out of place" gory scenes.

Story

Ushio & Tora centers around the travels and battles of Ushio Aotsuki, who is constantly being stalked and aided by a gigantic, supernatural, and sometimes invisible tiger-like monster named Tora. Ushio's family maintains a temple in Japan, where 500 years ago, his samurai ancestor battled that same monster to a standstill, and eventually trapped him against a rock using a cursed spear called the "Beast Spear", which grants strength, speed, and endurance to the wielder in exchange for his soul. Ushio accidentally opened their basement door Tora was trapped in.

Initially, Ushio refuses to remove the spear pinning Tora down (as Tora made the strategic blunder of mentioning that the first thing he would do upon being freed would be to devour Ushio), but Tora's unsealed 500 years of demonic presence attracts various weak monsters to the temple that will soon take from and attack humans. Ushio is forced to free Tora, who would like to eat Ushio, but dares not since Ushio keeps the spear close by. The series focuses on their relationship, interspersed with battles against mythological foes, and with Tora's attempts to grapple with modern life. During the regular battles, Ushio slowly begins to notice that as much as Tora claims to be irredeemable, the demon takes to fighting evil and defending the innocent with more enthusiasm than he cares to admit.

Media

Manga

Ushio & Tora, written and illustrated by Kazuhiro Fujita, was serialized in Shogakukan's shōnen manga magazine Weekly Shōnen Sunday from January 24, 1990, to October 23, 1996. Shogakukan collected its 312 individual chapters in thirty-three individual tankōbon volumes, released from November 17, 1990, to December 10, 1996. An additional gaiden volume was released on May 17, 1997. Shogakukan re-published the series in a nineteen-volume bunkoban edition from September 15, 2004, to March 15, 2006. A twenty-volume kazenban edition was published between May 18, 2015, and December 16, 2016.

Fujita drew a two-chapter short of the series to raise funds for areas devastated by the March 2011 earthquake. These chapters were published in Weekly Shōnen Sunday on December 26, 2012, and January 9, 2013.

Other print media
Four light novels written by Bunjūrō Nakayama (as Katsuyuki Shiroike) were published under Shogakukan's Super Quest Bunko imprint. They were released from December 18, 1992, to September 29, 1995.<ref></p></ref> Two light novels written by Nakayama were published under Shogakukan's Gagaga Bunko imprint on December 18, 2008, and January 21, 2009.

Two artbooks were published by Shogakukan on April 16 and July 16, 1997. Both artbooks were re-released in a new edition, including more illustrations and interviews, on April 15, 2015.

Original video animation
Ushio & Tora was adapted into a ten-episode original video animation (OVA) series produced by Toho and animated by studio Pastel, released from September 11, 1992, to August 1, 1993. A single parody OVA episode was released on October 1, 1993.

In North America, ADV Films released the first two episodes on VHS in 1998, but the project was abandoned. In 2003, ADV re-released the series on DVD, with a new dub, and including all the episodes.

Anime

An anime television adaptation was produced by MAPPA and Studio VOLN. It was directed by Satoshi Nishimura and written by Toshiki Inoue and Kazuhiro Fujita, featuring character designs by Tomoko Mori and music by Eishi Segawa. The anime consists of two parts: the first part (episodes 1–26) aired between July 3 and December 25, 2015, and the second part (episodes 27–39) aired between April 1 and June 24, 2016. A complete box set, including all the thirty-nine episodes, was released in Japan on December 20, 2017.

In North America, both seasons were streamed on Crunchyroll. The series was licensed by Sentai Filmworks in 2015, and began streaming with an English dub on Hidive in 2017. It has also been licensed in the United Kingdom by Manga Entertainment.

Video games
Ushio to Tora game was released for the Super Famicom (in Japan only) on January 22, 1993. The game is an action title created by Yutaka. Players can take the role of Ushio or Tora. Ushio to Tora: Shin'en no Daiyō was released for the Family Computer on July 9, 1993.

Ushio is also featured as a playable character in the Weekly Shōnen Sunday and Weekly Shōnen Magazine crossover game Sunday vs Magazine: Shūketsu! Chōjō Daikessen.

Stage play
In July 2022, it was announced that the series would receive a stage play adaptation, directed by Naoyuki Yoshihisa and starring Keita Tokushiro as Ushio and Takehiro Haruhira as Tora. It ran at the Theater Sun Mall in Tokyo from August 18–21, 2022.

Reception

Manga
By 2015, Ushio & Tora had over 30 million copies in circulation. The manga won the 37th Shogakukan Manga Award for shōnen category in 1992. It won the Seiun Award in the Best Comic category in 1997. On a 2020 poll conducted by the Goo website about the best Weekly Shōnen Sunday titles, Ushio & Tora ranked second. On TV Asahi's Manga Sōsenkyo 2021 poll, in which 150.000 people voted for their top 100 manga series, the series ranked #48.

Original video animation
Charles McCarter of Ex.org wrote that "[t]he fun of this series stems entirely from the uneasy relationship with Ushio and Tora", praising as well Chikao Ohtsuka's performance as Tora "changing from frightening to hurt and offended in the blink of an eye." McCarter labeled the series as a "grown-up, supernaturally powered Calvin and Hobbes", and called the animation "relatively high", and the battle scenes "well-choreographed and executed." McCarter concluded: "while the fights are intense and entertaining, some of the best moments in this series are the quiet laughs that come from the giant Tora perched atop Ushio's shoulders, unseen and unheard by everyone but him." Kevin A. Pezzano of SciFi.com called the "amusingly antagonistic relationship" between Ushio and Tora the "highlight of the anime." Pezzano noted that the combination of action scenes and comedic scenes may turn off fans of either genres, but concluded: "[o]n the whole, though, if you don't mind the odd combination, Ushio and Tora is worth picking up." Andrew Tei of AnimeOnDVD praised the series for its comedy and the relationships between the characters, concluding: "[t]his is one of those great old budget titles that should find its way easily onto your shelf."

Mike Toole of Anime Jump called the series "just about the most shounen show I've ever seen", adding that despite its "formulaic premise, sloppy character design, and fairly lackluster animation", the series is "quite charming", praising as well its "fast-paced" action scenes and slapstick comedy, and the new English dub made for the OVA. Toole, however, criticized its gory scenes, commenting that while "it doesn't match Violence Jack or Fist of the North Star in terms of sheer bloodletting", the sheer level of it is out of place, concluding: "I rather highly recommend Ushio and Tora, but only for those not easily shocked by graphic violence." Brian Hanson of the same website commented that the series "definitely has the feel of being like a "best of" album from a much longer manga series", adding that "[s]ome of the characters introduced feel like they should have a larger impact on the progression of the story than they actually do […] but are cast aside in the very next episode in favor of the new monster-of-the-week, never to be heard from again." Hanson concluded: "Ushio and Tora is nothing particularly noteworthy, aside from a few clever bits of animation smattered here and there, and some admittedly funny extras."

Barb Lien-Cooper of Sequential Tart called the series "Japan's answer to Stanley and His Monster." Lien-Cooper remarked that the series "starts out like it's only going to be your standard cute anime with only slight hints of supernatural doings", and later it "changes into something BETTER than before. The episodes start working as credible horror anime, as well as above-average teen comedy anime." Lien-Cooper lamented that due to its "disturbing" violence and sexual references the series cannot be recommended to small children, but stated that "bigger kids through adults" should like it. Stephen D. Grant of THEM Anime Reviews called the concept of the series "amazingly cheap and contrived when you read about it, but manages to blow you away in just about every way." Grant stated that the comedy of the series is well handled, but pointed out that its gory scenes "bordered on the gratuitous level" and that they are "definitely not for the weak of heart at times." Grant added: "Ushio and Tora is an awesome series that lets plot take a back seat to character development to great effect." Jonathan Mays of Anime News Network commented: "Ushio & Tora fits all of the stereotypes of bad shonen anime: ugly character designs, lots of fighting, and a "save the female love interest" plot line. However, get past all of that and you have a genuinely funny OAV series", adding as well that it is "worth watching once." Bamboo Dong of the same website called it "one of those shows that so stupid it's cute", and compared it to Inuyasha, recommending to watch said series instead of Ushio & Tora. Dong commented that despite its violence, the series is able to remain funny, but that the jokes "get re-hashed often and have a tendency to get old very quickly." Dong ultimately labeled the series as "mediocre" and that the story "would have done so much better had it been given the time and energy to develop further." Todd Ciolek of the same website called Ushio & Tora as a "not-unwatchable demon-hunting series."

Anime
In a review of the first episode, Miranda Sanchez of IGN praised the interaction between the characters and the comedic moments, also praising how MAPPA and Studio VOLN were able to transfer the look and essence of the original manga to anime. Sanchez concluded: "[t]his first episode not only flows well and establishes a good base, but also maintains the looks and feel of great ‘90s anime. Ushio and Tora are constantly underestimating each other, which not only provides for great comedy, but also sets up great theme that can carry through the series."

Reviewing the first season, Stig Høgset of THEM Anime Reviews commended its "raw, old-timer shounen energy", adding that it "oozes retro from every pore of its sharply designed body, and it's absolutely delightful." Høgset added that while some aspects feel "a bit basic and dated at times", "Ushio's cheerful idiocy and bursting enthusiasm is a nice break from the snarky anti-hero knowitalls and tellitnones of today." Reviewing the second season, Høgset noted that due to the cut down on its episode number, its pace "really picks up." Høgset called the conclusion a "bittersweet, but magnificent end", concluding: [Ushio & Tora is] still a classic with memorable characters, fun interactions and a heart as big as the sun." Gareth Evans of Starburst commented that the lighter tone of the series' first half switched to a more serious one in the second half seems "unbalancing when considering all of the episodes together, but it is a change that is earned", concluding: "[t]he series itself is an action-packed fantasy, with elements of classic Japanese horror. It can feel a bit overly complex at times, but the narrative ultimately comes together in a satisfying way that builds on earlier story threads."

Three critics of The Fandom Post reviewed the series' home video release. Chris Beveridge particularly highlighted the use of older designs through modern animation techniques, retaining the elements that make them identifiable from their period of origin, which "allows it to stand out well against everything else today and provide a nod to old school fans that see something familiar and nostalgic." Chris Homer commented that the "amount of love for this remake is obvious" and that despite compressing thirty-three volumes into thirty-nine episodes, the series "does get through the story as best as it can." Homer conclude: "[i]t is a high octane action show at heart, with lots of fighting and cool looking monsters, combined with the sometimes comic, sometimes serious dynamic between Ushio and Tora means that it is definitely worth going for the ride." Brandon Varnell commented that the series has a "convoluted plot with a number of twists that sometimes work and sometimes don’t", stating as well that while the relationship between Ushio and Tora is "easily the highlight of this series", the "half-assed romance" between Ushio and several other girls, including Asako, feels "forced", "inconclusive" and a waste of screen time, also criticizing Ushio's lack of development through the story. Varnell, however, ultimately called it "a series that shounen fans will enjoy."

Gabriella Ekens of Anime News Network commented that she enjoyed the series, calling it a "supernatural action series in the vein of Yū Yū Hakusho and Inuyasha", and particularly highlighted the producers' efforts to recreate its '90s aesthetic with modern-day techniques. Ekens commented that the plot is "remarkably well structured", the characters "very likable" and the monster designs are "metal as all hell." Ekens concluded: "[a]s a potent nostalgia bomb, Ushio & Tora will scratch – or perhaps awaken – a few itches in current anime fans who fondly remember another time."

References

Further reading

External links
  
  
 
 

1990 manga
1992 anime OVAs
1993 anime OVAs
2015 anime television series debuts
2016 anime television series debuts
ADV Films
Adventure anime and manga
Bunjūrō Nakayama
Comedy anime and manga
Dark fantasy anime and manga
Films with screenplays by Toshiki Inoue
Gagaga Bunko
MAPPA
Muse Communication
OVAs composed by Shirō Sagisu
Sentai Filmworks
Shogakukan franchises
Shogakukan manga
Shōnen manga
Supernatural anime and manga
Tokyo MX original programming
Winners of the Shogakukan Manga Award for shōnen manga